Popielewo  (German: Gross Poplow) is a village in the administrative district of Gmina Połczyn-Zdrój, within Świdwin County, West Pomeranian Voivodeship, in north-western Poland.

Notable residents
 Heinrich von Manteuffel (7 November 1696 – 10 July 1778), Prussian general

See also 

 History of Pomerania

References

Villages in Świdwin County